Nottage is a surname. Notable people with the surname include:

Bernard Nottage (1945-2017), Bahamian track and field athlete, politician, gynecologist
Dexter Nottage (born 1970), American football player
Lynn Nottage (born 1964), American playwright
Sean Nottage (born 1965), Bahamian swimmer
Ken Nottage (born 1959), England international basketball player.